Ivan of Bulgaria may refer to:

Ivan Vladislav of Bulgaria, Bulgarian emperor (1015–18)
Ivan Asen I of Bulgaria, Bulgarian emperor (1189–96)
Ivan II or Kaloyan of Bulgaria, Bulgarian emperor (1197–1207)
Ivan Asen II of Bulgaria, Bulgarian emperor (1218–41)
Ivan Stephen of Bulgaria, Bulgarian emperor (1330–31)
Ivan Alexander of Bulgaria, Bulgarian emperor (1331–71)
Ivan Shishman of Bulgaria, Bulgarian emperor in Tarnovo (1371–95)
Ivan Sratsimir of Bulgaria, Bulgarian emperor in Vidin (1356–96)